Prince Oluebube Eke (born 18 August 1981) is a Nigerian actor, film director, writer, television personality and model. He was married to Muma Gee, a businesswoman with whom he had three children. He first garnered fame as an actor in 2003 starring in the Nollywood movie Indecent Proposal. Some of his other movies include Spade: The Last Assignment (2009), Mirror of Life (2010), Secret Code (2011), and A Minute Silence (2012).

Early life and education
Born in Ngor Okpala, Imo State, Eke was the last child in a family of seven boys and a girl. He attended Holy Ghost College, Owerri for his secondary education and had a master's degree in International Relations from Imo State University.

Partial filmography

References

External links

Living people
Male actors from Imo State
Imo State University alumni
Nigerian male models
Nigerian film directors
Nigerian television personalities
Nigerian male film actors
21st-century Nigerian male actors
1977 births
Igbo actors
Nigerian male television actors
People from Imo State